Uncatena Island is one of the Elizabeth Islands of Dukes County, Massachusetts, United States. It is the most northerly of the Elizabeth Islands and lies just off the northernmost point of Naushon Island. Uncatena has a land area of 0.492 km² (0.19 sq mi, or 121.6 acres), and was uninhabited as of the 2000 census.  It is part of the Town of Gosnold.

Elizabeth Islands
Gosnold, Massachusetts
Uninhabited islands of Massachusetts
Coastal islands of Massachusetts